Unsworth is a village and residential area of the Metropolitan Borough of Bury, in Greater Manchester, England. The population of Unsworth Ward, as of the 2011 census is 9,492.

Historically a part of Lancashire, Unsworth has been recorded as far back as the 13th century. Its name is thought to derive from the Old English word “hound,” literally meaning “place of the hounds.” Unsworth's development as a village mostly took place during and after the industrial revolution, when due to its nearby waterways, it became involved in the manufacturing of dye and bleach. The mid-20th century onwards saw major changes in the village. The construction of Sunny Bank Road, and the M66 motorway which both cut through the village significantly shifted its character, with its western side becoming suburbanised, while leaving its eastern side largely agricultural.

History

Toponymy
The name of Unsworth derives from Old English. It is made up of two parts: hund, relating either the modern English hound, or a personal name; and worth, a common Old English suffix which typically refers to either an enclosure, or to a protected place. Thus, the name essentially means "enclosure of somebody named Hund", or "place of the hounds".

On 10 June 1291 Edward I granted hunting rights to the Pilkington family over Unsworth and the surrounding areas, suggesting that the enclosure of the hounds might refer to the place where hunting dogs were historically kept. Moreover, the name of nearby Stand Hall (part of the same historical estate as Unsworth) may have referred to the hunting stand from which the estate could be surveyed for game, indicating ties between Unsworth's name, and medieval hunting in the area.

The name was first recorded in 1291 as Hundeswrth, then as Undesworth in 1322. The historical loss of the "h" sound in the names of villages is a typical feature of Lancashire place names, caused by an elision typical of Lancashire dialects.

Early history
After the Norman conquest in 1066, Unsworth was part of the Pilkington estate before passing into the hands of the Earls of Derby in the 15th century. In the hearth tax collected in 1666, Unsworth had 40 hearths with no house having six. Unsworth is part of the historic county of Lancashire, and was in the Salford Hundred subdivision.

A 1984 archeological investigation suggested that there may have an iron smelting site on Unsworth Moss, by the banks of Whittle Brook. While not conclusive, the investigation explored the possibility of a regionally significant medieval bloomery that used the brook as a water source. In 1997, a further field walking investigation reiterated the suggestion of a medieval settlement in the area, and a 2021 report by the Greater Manchester Combined Authority suggested that the site may be of regional importance, who recommended undertaking a survey into the extent of the potential iron smelting site before scheduling could be considered.

Industrial history onwards
Unsworth and its waterways were sources of water for local industries such as bleach and dye works, there was also clay for brickworks. During the Industrial Revolution farming, cotton mills, print-works and bleach-grounds provided employment for its inhabitants. Cotton mills operating in the late 19th century were Worthington and Company whose Victoria Mills contained 220 looms producing ticking, nankeens, linen and drills and the Unsworth Finishing Company.

The first major change in the 20th century was the construction of the Royal Air Force's logistics base at nearby Pilsworth in the Second World War, parts of which remained in use in the early 1980s by shipping firms and other industries.

Unsworth was affected by the construction of the M66 motorway. The road between junctions 3 and 4 passes behind Unsworth Pole and through Back o' th' Moss Farm. Construction of the motorway, along with urbanisation in the mid-1970s reduced the dairy farm's acreage from 300 to 150 acres, resulted in a loss of the dairy production and lower yields of "hay, corn, barley and potatoes"

Governance
Unsworth was a chapelry the eastern portion of the township of Pilkington in the parish of Prestwich-cum-Oldham in the hundred of Salford and county of Lancashire in Northern England. When local government was reorganised in 1894, Pilkington ceased to exist as a township and Unsworth gave its name to a new township governed by a parish council made up of Unsworth and Pilsworth with part of Heap.

Historically in Lancashire, the village, with the passage of the Local Government Act 1972, became part of the Metropolitan Borough of Bury on 1 April 1974. On the borough council it is a marginal Labour/Conservative ward that has tended to vote Labour. From 1983 to 2010 it was in the parliamentary constituency of Bury North, before being transferred to the Bury South constituency in 2010, currently held by the Conservative Christian Wakeford since 2019.

Geography

Unsworth lies on high ground between two brooks running north to Whittle Brook and the River Roch, covering 972 acres of mostly arable land that was boggy until drainage was installed. Parr Brook joins the River Roch at Blackford Bridge.

The village and surrounding area were urbanised in the 1960s. Transformation began in the 1950s with the construction of housing and the road known as Sunny Bank Road connecting the old village to the A56 arterial road between Bury and Manchester.

Hollins Vale

Hollins Vale is a local nature reserve to the north of the village, it became Bury's third such nature reserve in 2003. It is managed for the benefit of the local wildlife and community by Hollins Conservation Group.

The reservation consists of woodland, marshland, open grassland (which is managed by cattle that roam the area), and historic hedgerows.  Hollins Brook, a tributary of the River Roch, meanders through the valley and connects with "The Cut," a canal-like lodge popular with local angling groups such as the Unsworth Anglers, before continuing west where it connects with Castle Brook and Whittle Brook.

Hollins Vale contains two of Bury's fifty Sites of Biological Importance, first granted in 1981 owing to its biodiversity. The first is a portion of Hollins Vale's grasslands, which is home to a diverse range of waterside plants. The second is Hollins Plantation, a historic woodland containing bluebells, lesser celandines, wood speedwells, wood anemones, and violets. The reserve is also home to many species of wildlife such as  linnet, reed bunting, snipe and grey partridge. The birds and small mammals attract predators such as kestrel, sparrowhawk, buzzard, tawny owl, weasel and stoat. Many species of butterfly are part of the ecosystem as is an increasing rabbit population. In the summer, significant populations of dragonflies and damselflys can be seen in the wetland areas.

Recent construction efforts have, and continue to threaten the ecology of the nature reserve. Since the construction of the M66 motorway, the populations of skylark, lapwing and hare have disappeared. As of 2020, plans are being developed by the local council to build 200 homes within 100m of the reservation, which may have further impacts on its ecology and biodiversity.

The reserve houses multiple walking trails, managed by Hollins Conservation Group. Although not all public footpaths are clearly defined, and there is no formal circular route, there are multiple routes available. The nature reserve is popular with locals, with the Conservation Group organising activity days such as the annual "Go Wild" event, encouraging locals to engage with their surroundings.

Unsworth Moss

Unsworth Moss is a predominantly agricultural area of undulating terrain, containing several woodland blocks. The area that lies along the eastern edge of Unsworth, hedged by Hollins Brook, makes up the Moss, and is distinct from the rest of Unsworth in its relatively agricultural setting, compared to the predominantly residential use of land in the west of the village. Unsworth Moss forms a habitat for farmland birds as well as great crested newt and barn owl. Whittle Brook flows north west through Unsworth Moss, forming the wetland conditions which have caused peat to form around its bank. The brook is a defining feature of the undulating landscape of the moss. In a 2021 report, the Greater Manchester Combined Authority noted that the 'u-shaped valleys of the brook and associated vegetation form pleasant characteristic features in the landscape.' Several public footpaths and walking trails cross over Unsworth Moss; Bury Council maintains two footbridges in its north-eastern area, which are used by walkers to access the Moss.

Multiple archeological investigations on Unsworth Moss have suggested the possibility of a medieval iron smelting site on Unsworth Moss, by the banks of Whittle Brook.

Demography

Population change

Religion

Unsworth chapelry is included part of the parish of Middleton. St George's Chapel was consecrated in November 1730 on a site provided by the Earl of Derby. The chapel was rebuilt at a cost of £1,500 in 1843 by the architects' practice Paley, Austin and Paley The church is built in brick with a bellcote, and has a graveyard to the north. A screen was installed enclosing the chancel in 1920 and removed in 1988. In 2009 the church completed a £70,000 refurbishment which saw repairs to the roof, interior redecoration, and the replacement of the old wooden pews with individual seats.

In 1846 a chapel was erected by Wesleyan Methodists on Hollins Lane, along with a Sunday school. They have since been demolished and replaced by a Methodist church.

Landmarks

After the First World War, a war memorial was erected at Unsworth Pole, it contains the names of 60 who died in the First World War and eight who died in the Second World War. In 2017, the monument was given Grade II listed building status.

Unsworth Library is part of the Bury Libraries group.
 Proposals to close the library in 2010 met with opposition. Local musician Guy Garvey was amongst the opposers, claiming to have written some of his best lyrics (for his band Elbow) at the library, finding it to be "a source of inspiration”. The proposal was withdrawn in January 2011.

Unsworth Hall (formerly Unsworth Lodge) is a 19th-century Georgian mansion that now forms the clubhouse of Bury Golf Club. The hall was the former home of the first mayor of Bury, John Duckworth Esq. J.P., before being purchased by Bury Golf Club in 1920, along with its adjacent land, to construct a new links following the commandeering of their previous links at Redvales during the First World War. The hall has been refurbished and extended some time around the 1950s, and is currently on Bury Council's list of buildings of special architectural or historic interest as a non-designated heritage asset.

Education

The area was the site of Bury's first comprehensive school, built in 1971. Unsworth Comprehensive was later renamed Castlebrook High School, and was recently changed again to Unsworth Academy. The school has been rated as "good" by the education standards office, OFSTED following their inspection in 2010, an improvement from the school's previous "satisfactory" rating of 2006. The school has recently completed a major rebuilding and rebranding, but still remains on the same site.

Unsworth has four primary schools: Unsworth Primary School near Parr Lane, established in 1965; Sunny Bank Primary School, established in 1959;  Hollins Grundy Primary School near Hollins Lane, established in 1972; and Bury and Whitefield Jewish Primary School, established in 1984.

Public services
Before its the closing of its public enquiry counter in 2017, Unsworth residents had been able to access services in neighbouring Whitefield, however the nearest accessible police station to Unsworth is currently in Bury. A Police Community Support Officer is assigned directly to the village, along with an Inspector, a Police Sergeant, and a Police Constable.

Public transport is co-ordinated by Transport for Greater Manchester. The 92 and 97 busses run along Hollins Lane, connecting the village with both Manchester and Bury, while the 93 and 135 to services between Bury and Manchester, along with the 95 service between Bury and Salford can be accessed from the Blackford Bridge bus stop on Unsworth's western boundary.

Statutory emergency fire and rescue service is provided by the Greater Manchester Fire and Rescue Service, with the closest fire station being in Whitefield.

Culture
The home of the ancient Unsworth family was noted for containing an oak table and panel with carvings of Saint George and the Dragon, the Eagle and Child, the Lion and the Unicorn and the Unsworth Dragon connected with a local legend. Thomas Unsworth supposedly owned the house when a dragon ravaged the area. Bullets from guns had no effect but Thomas Unsworth mortally wounded the dragon by firing his dagger from a musket. The carvings on the panel and table were supposedly made with the dagger. The origin of the story may be related to the estate granted to a member of the family, possibly Thomas, for unknown military service. This legend, connected with the folklore of Bury, was the subject of a multimedia art installation, hosted by Bury Art Museum as part of the 2016 Transition Festival.

The Pole (or Unsworth Pole) was named after the pitch pole fixed by the Earl of Derby which was greased each year for the village's pot fair which was last held over a century ago. The challenge was to climb the greased pole to claim the prize. The last known successful ascender was Adam Holt in 1900. The current pole is not the original which was blown over in a gale, falling into the Bay Horse Inn.

Some local folklore suggests Robert Clive had ties to the area in his early years, however this appears to be false. The claim was first recorded by Francis Gerald Downing of Unsworth Vicarage in a self-published pamphlet. None of Clive's biographers make any reference to Unsworth.

Public houses include the Bay Horse, the Queen Anne, the Hollins Bush Inn, and the Sir Robert Peel. Former public houses include The Dragon, referencing the Unsworth Dragon legend, which was converted into Co-Op food shop; and The Bridge Inn, at Blackford Bridge, which was demolished after it was irreparably damaged in a gas explosion in March 1998; and the Lord Clive making reference to Clive's alleged ties to the area, constructed in 1964 and demolished in 2020.

Sport

Unsworth Cricket Club was founded in 1883 on Pole Lane and is a member of the Central Lancashire Cricket League.

Bury Golf Club, founded in 1890 as a 9-hole course at Redvales, moved to Unsworth in 1921 where it has an 18-hole course. The clubhouse is based at Unsworth Hall and has a room commemorating Harry Vardon who won seven major championships from 1896 to 1914. Pike Fold Golf Club was founded 1909 and moved to Back o' th' Moss Farm in 1999.

Unsworth Junior Football Club, established in 1974, has 24 teams ranging from Under 8s to Under 18s. The teams practice at Hillock, and play in the North Bury Junior Football League, where the Under 18s team plays in the Premier Division.

Castlebrook Community Sports Centre in the grounds of Castlebrook High School has a floodlit astroturf pitch and two sports halls.

References
Notes

Bibliography

External links
BBC Domesday Project- Unsworth
Unsworth War Memorial (Compiled list of men and their history)

Geography of the Metropolitan Borough of Bury
Areas of Greater Manchester
Villages in Greater Manchester
Bury, Greater Manchester